Carnegie Public Library is a historic Carnegie library building located at Sumter, Sumter County, South Carolina. It was built in 1916–1917, and is a two-story, brick Beaux-Arts style building. The front facade features four arched windows with limestone surrounds and the main entryway flanked by two Ionic order columns. It was one of the 1,679 public libraries built in the United States with funding from the Carnegie Corporation. The Sumter library was constructed with $10,000 provided by the Carnegie Corporation.  It housed the public library until 1968, and afterwards housed a local genealogical society.

It was added to the National Register of Historic Places in 1994.

References

Carnegie libraries in South Carolina
Libraries on the National Register of Historic Places in South Carolina
Beaux-Arts architecture in South Carolina
Library buildings completed in 1917
Buildings and structures in Sumter County, South Carolina
National Register of Historic Places in Sumter County, South Carolina